Hammatoderus rubefactus is a species of beetle in the family Cerambycidae. It was described by Henry Walter Bates in 1872. It is known from Nicaragua, Mexico, Costa Rica, and Panama.

References

Hammatoderus
Beetles described in 1872